A Summit Borderline/A Drop Oceanic is the debut studio album by Canadian rock band Parabelle.

Track listing
Source: Amazon

A Summit Borderline

A Drop Oceanic

Personnel 
 Kevin Matisyn – Vocals
 Chris "Gio" Giovenco – Bass
 Tim Huskinson – Guitar
 Miles Stelzig – Guitar
 Blaine Porpiglia – Drums

References

2009 debut albums
Parabelle albums